Tales from the Emerald Sword Saga is a compilation album released by symphonic power metal band Rhapsody in 2004.

Track listing

Track differences
Track 8, "Riding the Winds of Eternity", is the same as the one found in Symphony of Enchanted Lands, only with the sound of waves at the beginning left out.
Track 9, "Dawn of Victory", features a brief tympani roll at the start of the track not found on the album version.
Track 10, "Holy Thunderforce", distinguishes itself from the original version from Dawn of Victory for the loss of most of the choir parts.

References

Rhapsody of Fire compilation albums
2004 compilation albums
Limb Music albums